Mountain View High School (MVHS) is located at 3535 Truman Avenue, Mountain View, California, 94040. It is one of two Mountain View-Los Altos Union High School District public high schools - the other being Los Altos High School. The two main feeder schools are Graham Middle School and Blach Intermediate School.

Statistics

Awards and ranking 
The school earned the distinction of California Distinguished High School in 1988, 1994, and 2003. In 2000, 2007, 2013, and 2019, MVHS received a full 6-year accreditation from the Western Association of Schools and Colleges (WASC). The school sent 95% of its graduating class of 2019 to post-secondary schools. In addition, the California Department of Education recognized Mountain View High School as a California Gold Ribbon School, citing its "Equal Opportunities Schools" program that identifies and supports first generation students taking rigorous academic courses. Newsweek ranked Mountain View High School as the 293rd best public open enrollment high school in the nation in 2005 and the 280th best school in 2015.

Demographics 

Mountain View High School serves a diverse student body of over 2000 students from the cities of Mountain View, Los Altos and Los Altos Hills. As of 2018–2019 school year, the enrollment at Mountain View High School was 2,062. During the 2019 school year, the students were 40% White, 23% Hispanic, 22% Asian, 3% Filipino, 2% Black, 1% Hawaiian Native/Pacific Islander, <1% American Indian/Alaskan Native, and 10% two or more races.

Standardized testing

History 
Public education in Mountain View, California dates as far as 1858, but lacked a high school. Before Mountain View High School was created in 1902, students living within the town's limits commuted by train from Downtown Mountain View Station on Castro Street to attend either Palo Alto or Santa Clara High Schools. In August 1902, the town of Mountain View opened its first school at the corner of El Camino Real and Calderon Streets, named Mountain View Union High School. By the dawn of the 1920s, the high school saw a spike in enrollment and the campus was unable to accommodate any more students. In 1922, the school district built a new campus at a new location on Castro Street. The new campus first opened its doors in late August 1924. Several years later, in 1933, the opening of Moffett Field pushed the expansion of the campus with additional facilities to accommodate military children.

By the 1950s, Mountain View Union High School was once again facing challenges with a growing student body and, in 1956, the district added Los Altos High; in the once small rural town of Los Altos. By 1961, the district added an additional high school near Grant Road at the corners of Truman and Bryant. This was named Chester F. Awalt High School, the first superintendent of the district.  Mountain View Union High School was closed in 1981 due to declining enrollment. Mountain View School District (known today as MVLA) decided to sell the original school buildings back to the city and relocate to the Awalt High School location, changing Awalt's name to Mountain View. Los Altos High School adopted the MV school colors and mascot. Thus, Mountain View became the black and gold Spartans and Los Altos dropped the Knights and became the blue and gray Eagles.

Classes 
The high school holds an open enrollment policy: any student may register for any class being offered at the school, regardless of a student's grade. Mountain View High, like most Bay Area schools, offers all 8 of the AP advanced STEM classes. Environmental Science AP and Psychology AP were added as class options for the academic year of 2013–2014.

Athletics 
MVHS Athletics is part of Central Coast Section (CCS), which governs High School Athletics from San Francisco to King City, and the California Interscholastic Federation (CIF). The school sponsors the following interscholastic teams for young men and women: basketball, cross country, golf, soccer, swimming & diving, tennis, track & field, football, volleyball, badminton, lacrosse, wrestling, and water polo.

Notable alumni

Erik Davis, Major League Baseball pitcher, formerly with the Washington Nationals
Adam Krikorian, head coach of the UCLA water polo team and the US women's Olympic water polo team
Blake Krikorian, technology entrepreneur
Brendan Nyhan, political scientist 
Kendal Smith, NFL player
Jose Antonio Vargas, Washington Post reporter and 2008 Pulitzer Prize winner

See also 
 List of closed secondary schools in California

References

External links 
 
 The Oracle, MVHS school newspaper

Map: 

Mountain View–Los Altos Union High School District
Buildings and structures in Mountain View, California
High schools in Santa Clara County, California
Public high schools in California
1902 establishments in California